"Five Little Fingers" is a song written and first recorded by American country singer-songwriter Bill Anderson. It was released as a single in 1963 via Decca Records and became a major hit.

Background and release
"Five Little Fingers" was recorded on November 26, 1963, at the Bradley Studio, located in Nashville, Tennessee. The sessions were produced by Owen Bradley, who would serve as Anderson's producer through most of years with Decca Records. The single's B-side and its follow-up single was also recorded at the same session.

"Five Little Fingers" was released as a single by Decca Records in December 1963. It spent a total of 18 weeks on the Billboard Hot Country Singles chart before reaching number five in February 1964. "Five Little Fingers" was Anderson's seventh top ten hit on the country songs survey at the time of its release. It was later released on his 1964 studio album Bill Anderson Sings.

Track listings
7" vinyl single
 "Five Little Fingers" – 3:00
 "Easy Come – Easy Go" – 2:08

Chart performance

References

1963 singles
1963 songs
Bill Anderson (singer) songs
Decca Records singles
Song recordings produced by Owen Bradley
Songs written by Bill Anderson (singer)